Upper Greenwood Lake is a census-designated place (CDP) in Passaic and Sussex counties, New Jersey, United States. It includes residential neighborhoods around the northern and central parts of its namesake lake. It is primarily in West Milford Township in Passaic County but extends to the northwest into Vernon Township in Sussex County. It is bordered to the west by Wawayanda State Park, to the southeast by Abram S. Hewitt State Forest, and to the northeast by the town of Warwick in Orange County, New York.

The lake drains to the northeast into Long House Creek, which descends into New York and joins Wawayanda Creek, a west-flowing tributary of Pochuck Creek, which in turn runs north to the Wallkill River, a northeast-flowing tributary of the Hudson.

The Upper Greenwood Lake community was first listed as a CDP prior to the 2020 census.

Demographics

References 

Census-designated places in Passaic County, New Jersey
Census-designated places in Sussex County, New Jersey
Census-designated places in New Jersey
West Milford, New Jersey
Vernon Township, New Jersey